Johannes Nilsson (born March 16, 1995) is a Swedish ice hockey player. He is currently playing with Brynäs IF of the Swedish Hockey League (SHL).

Nilsson made his Swedish Hockey League debut playing with Brynäs IF during the 2014–15 SHL season.

References

External links

1995 births
Living people
Brynäs IF players
Swedish ice hockey forwards